Ueli Aebi  is a Swiss structural biologist and co-founder of the Maurice E. Müller Institute for Structural Biology at the Biozentrum University of Basel.

Life 
Aebi studied physics, mathematics, and molecular biology at the Universities of Bern and Basel from 1967 to 1974, graduating in 1977 in biophysics at the University of Basel. After establishing his academic career in the United States (University of California, Los Angeles, Johns Hopkins University School of Medicine), in 1986 he returned to the Biozentrum as professor of structural biology. He was co-founder of the Maurice E. Müller Institute for Structural Biology and its director from 1986 until reaching emeritus status in 2011.

Work 
Aebi is recognized as a pioneer in integrative structural biology as well as mechano- and nanobiology. His work focused on the elucidation of the structure, function and assembly of the cyto- and nucleoskeleton and the nuclear pore complex (NPC), as well as the amyloid fibrils that are a hallmark of Alzheimer's disease. He studied the architecture of diverse supramolecular assemblies using a combination of light, electron and atomic force microscopy, X-ray crystallography, and protein engineering. Among others, Aebi determined the 3-dimensional structure of the NPC by cryo-electron tomography.

Awards and honors 
 1993 Elected Member of the European Molecular Biology Organization
 1999 Elected Member of the Academia Europaea
 2007 Dr. honoris causa (h.c.) from the 1st Medical Faculty, Charles University, Prague, Czech Republic
 2011 Carl Zeiss Lecture Award of the German Society for Cell Biology
 2011 Distinguished Scientist Award of the Microscopy Society of America

References

External links 
 Webpage Biozentrum, Emeriti

Living people
Scientists from Bern
University of Bern alumni
Johns Hopkins School of Medicine alumni
Members of the European Molecular Biology Organization
Biozentrum University of Basel
University of Basel alumni
Year of birth missing (living people)